The 1966 Intercontinental Cup was the two-legged tie to define the champion of the Intercontinental Cup. It was contested by Uruguayan club Peñarol and Spanish Real Madrid, which met again after their first encounter in 1960.

In the first match, held in Estadio Centenario, Peñarol beat Real Madrid 2–0. The second leg, held at the Santiago Bernabéu Stadium, saw the Aurinegro team defeat the Spanish side again, by the same scoreline. Therefore, Peñarol won the series 4–0 on points, achieving their second Intercontinental Cup trophy.

Qualified teams

Venues

Match details

First leg

Second leg

See also
1960 Intercontinental Cup  – contested between same teams
1965–66 European Cup
1966 Copa Libertadores
Real Madrid CF in international football competitions

References

Intercontinental Cup
Intercontinental Cup
Intercontinental Cup (football)
Intercontinental Cup 1966
Intercontinental Cup 1966
Inter
1966 in Uruguayan football
Sports competitions in Madrid
1960s in Madrid
Sports competitions in Montevideo
1960s in Montevideo
October 1966 sports events in Europe
October 1966 sports events in South America